John Star "Dick" Gossett (August 21, 1890 – October 6, 1962) was a Major League Baseball catcher. In 49 career games, he had 20 hits in 126 at-bats, with 10 RBIs. He batted and threw right-handed.

Gossett was born in Dennison, Ohio and died in Massillon, Ohio.

External links
Baseball Reference.com page

1890 births
1962 deaths
New York Yankees players
Major League Baseball catchers
Baseball players from Ohio
St. Joseph Drummers players
Indianapolis Indians players
Milwaukee Brewers (minor league) players
People from Dennison, Ohio